Mark Trenwith is an Adelaide-based Australian comedian and actor. He played "Bounce Back Man" in the ABC television series Being Me and starred alongside fellow Adelaide comedian Big Al in comedy show Give Us A Hug at the 2006 Adelaide Fringe Festival. He won the Adelaide Comedian of the Year and the People's Choice Award in 2010, both of which are categories in the Annual Adelaide Comedy Awards.

External links
 Mark Trenwith's website

Living people
Year of birth missing (living people)
Australian male television actors
Australian male comedians